Gobius roulei, Roule's goby, is a species of goby native to the eastern Atlantic Ocean and the Mediterranean Sea where it can be found at depths of from .  This species can reach a length of  TL. The specific name honours the French zoologist Louis Roule (1861-1942) who was the collector of the type.

References

Roule's goby
Fish of the Atlantic Ocean
Fish of the Adriatic Sea
Fish of the Mediterranean Sea
Fish of Europe
Taxa named by Fernando de Buen y Lozano
Fish described in 1928